Platynus is a genus of ground beetles in the family Carabidae. There are more than 180 described species in Platynus.

Species
These 183 species belong to the genus Platynus.

 Platynus acuniai (Darlington, 1937)  (Cuba)
 Platynus aeneicauda (Bates, 1891)  (Mexico)
 Platynus aeneosetosus Liebherr, 1989  (Panama)
 Platynus agilis LeConte, 1863  (North America)
 Platynus aguadensis (Perrault, 1991)  (Venezuela)
 Platynus algirinus (Buquet, 1840)  (Algeria)
 Platynus altifluminis (Darlington, 1936)  (Hispaniola)
 Platynus amone (Darlington, 1936)  (Hispaniola)
 Platynus anatolicus J.Schmidt, 1996  (Turkey)
 Platynus andrewesi (Morvan, 1996)  (India)
 Platynus angustatus Dejean, 1828  (North America)
 Platynus arboreus (Mateu, 1978)  (Mexico)
 Platynus asper Jedlicka, 1936  (China)
 Platynus assimilis (Paykull, 1790)  ((former) (Palearctic)
 Platynus azbleotroades (Morvan, 1996)  (India)
 Platynus ballorum Liebherr, 1992  (Mexico)
 Platynus banaticus (I.Frivaldszky von Frivald, 1865)  (Romania)
 Platynus baragua (Darlington, 1936)  (Cuba)
 Platynus barclayi J.Schmidt, 2009  (Pakistan)
 Platynus baroni (Casey, 1920)  (Mexico)
 Platynus batesi (Morvan, 2004)  (India)
 Platynus benardi (Andrewes, 1924)  (India)
 Platynus biramosus (Darlington, 1939)  (Hispaniola)
 Platynus bromeliarum (Darlington, 1937)  (the Lesser Antilles)
 Platynus bruesi (Darlington, 1936)  (the Lesser Antilles)
 Platynus bruneri (Darlington, 1937)  (Cuba)
 Platynus brunneomarginatus (Mannerheim, 1843)  (North America)
 Platynus bruskelchus (Morvan, 1996)  (India)
 Platynus bucheri (Darlington, 1937)  (Cuba)
 Platynus calathinus (Darlington, 1939)  (Hispaniola)
 Platynus carabiai (Darlington, 1937)  (Cuba)
 Platynus cavatus (Bates, 1882)  (Mexico)
 Platynus cavicola (Darlington, 1964)  (the Lesser Antilles)
 Platynus christophe (Darlington, 1936)  (Hispaniola)
 Platynus cinchonae (Darlington, 1934)  (the Lesser Antilles)
 Platynus cincticollis (Say, 1823)  (North America)
 Platynus cohni Liebherr & Will, 1996  (North America)
 Platynus complanatus Dejean, 1828  (Europe)
 Platynus conicicollis (Chaudoir, 1879)  (Mexico)
 Platynus constricticeps (Darlington, 1936)  (Hispaniola)
 Platynus consularis (Casey, 1920)  (Mexico)
 Platynus convexulus (Casey, 1920)  (Mexico)
 Platynus cubensis (Darlington, 1937)  (Cuba)
 Platynus cyanodorsalis Liebherr, 1989  (Panama)
 Platynus cychrinus (Darlington, 1936)  (Hispaniola)
 Platynus darlingtoni (Emden, 1949)  (the Lesser Antilles)
 Platynus daviesi Bousquet, 2012  (North America)
 Platynus decentis (Say, 1823)  (North America)
 Platynus depressus Dejean, 1831  (Europe)
 Platynus deuvei (Morvan, 1996)  (India)
 Platynus dianus (Jedlicka, 1934)  (Philippines)
 Platynus dilatipes Liebherr, 1989  (Mexico)
 Platynus districtus (Casey, 1920)  (Mexico)
 Platynus elongatulus Fischer von Waldheim, 1829
 Platynus eulabes (Bates, 1889)  (India)
 Platynus eupunctatus Liebherr, 1987  (the Lesser Antilles)
 Platynus faber (Darlington, 1936)  (the Lesser Antilles)
 Platynus ferghanicus (Belousov, 1991)  (Kyrgyzstan and Uzbekistan)
 Platynus fractilateralis Liebherr, 1987  (Hispaniola)
 Platynus fractilinea (Darlington, 1934)  (Hispaniola)
 Platynus franiai Liebherr, 1992  (Mexico)
 Platynus fratrorum (Darlington, 1937)  (Cuba)
 Platynus glacialis (Reitter, 1877)  (Romania and Ukraine)
 Platynus grandicollis (Motschulsky, 1850)  (Russia)
 Platynus grassator (Andrewes, 1932)  (India)
 Platynus haemorrhous (Perty, 1830)  (Brazil)
 Platynus hamatus Liebherr, 1989  (Mexico)
 Platynus henvelus (Morvan, 1996)  (India)
 Platynus herculeanus Liebherr & Godwin, 2004
 Platynus hypolithos (Say, 1823)  (North America)
 Platynus immarginatus J.Schmidt, 2009  (Nepal)
 Platynus incisus (Andrewes, 1927)  (India)
 Platynus indecentis Liebherr & Will, 1996  (North America)
 Platynus inops (Chaudoir, 1879)  (Belize, Guatemala, and Mexico)
 Platynus isthmiacus (Motschulsky, 1866)  (Panama)
 Platynus jaegeri (Dejean, 1831)  (Hispaniola)
 Platynus jamaicae (Darlington, 1953)
 Platynus kazuyoshii Morita & Kurosa, 1994  (Japan)
 Platynus klausnitzeri (J.Schmidt, 2005)  (Vietnam)
 Platynus kleebergi J.Schmidt, 2009  (Nepal)
 Platynus klickai Jedlicka, 1931  (China)
 Platynus krynickii (Sperk, 1835)  (Europe)
 Platynus kucerai (Morvan, 2004)  (India)
 Platynus laeviceps (Darlington, 1939)  (Hispaniola)
 Platynus leiroides (Perrault, 1991)  (Venezuela)
 Platynus lewisi (Darlington, 1953)
 Platynus lindrothi Baehr, 1982  (North America and France)
 Platynus lineopunctatus Liebherr, 1989  (Guatemala)
 Platynus livens (Gyllenhal, 1810)  (Europe)
 Platynus logicus (Casey, 1920)  (Mexico)
 Platynus longiventris Mannerheim, 1825  (Europe)
 Platynus lyratus (Chaudoir, 1879)  (North America)
 Platynus macer (Darlington, 1934)  (the Lesser Antilles)
 Platynus macropterus (Chaudoir, 1879)  (New Zealand)
 Platynus magnus (Bates, 1873)  (temperate Asia)
 Platynus mannerheimii (Dejean, 1828)  (Holarctic)
 Platynus marcus (Darlington, 1936)  (Hispaniola)
 Platynus mediopterus (Darlington, 1937)  (Cuba)
 Platynus medius (Darlington, 1937)  (Cuba)
 Platynus meurguesae (Morvan, 1996)  (India)
 Platynus meurguesianus (Morvan, 1996)  (Afghanistan)
 Platynus montezumae (Bates, 1878)  (Mexico)
 Platynus nuceus (Fairmaire, 1887)  (China)
 Platynus opaculus LeConte, 1863  (North America)
 Platynus ovipennis (Mannerheim, 1843)  (North America)
 Platynus pakistanensis (Morvan, 1996)  (Afghanistan, India, and Pakistan)
 Platynus panamensis (Casey, 1920)  (Panama)
 Platynus parallelosomus Liebherr, 1987  (the Lesser Antilles)
 Platynus parmarginatus Hamilton, 1893  (North America)
 Platynus pecki Barr, 1982  (North America)
 Platynus peirolerii Bassi, 1834  (France and Italy)
 Platynus pinarensis (Darlington, 1937)  (Cuba)
 Platynus platynidioides (Perrault, 1991)  (Venezuela)
 Platynus praedator (Andrewes, 1930)  (Bhutan, China, India, and Nepal)
 Platynus prognathus Van Dyke, 1926  (North America)
 Platynus protensus (A.Morawitz, 1863)  (East Asia)
 Platynus proximus (J.Frivaldszky, 1879)  (Bulgaria)
 Platynus punctus (Darlington, 1936)  (the Lesser Antilles)
 Platynus pygmaeus Liebherr, 1992  (Mexico)
 Platynus ramoni (Darlington, 1939)  (Hispaniola)
 Platynus rarus J.Schmidt, 2009  (India)
 Platynus rastafarius Liebherr, 1987  (the Lesser Antilles)
 Platynus richteri (Morvan, 1996)  (Pakistan)
 Platynus robustus (Chaudoir, 1878)  (Mexico)
 Platynus rougemonti (Morvan, 1996)  (Nepal)
 Platynus roysi (Darlington, 1937)  (the Lesser Antilles)
 Platynus rubrofemoratus Liebherr, 1989  (Mexico)
 Platynus santarosae (Perrault, 1991)  (Venezuela)
 Platynus satsunanus Habu, 1974  (Japan)
 Platynus schnitteri J.Schmidt, 2009  (Turkey)
 Platynus scriptellus (Darlington, 1939)  (Hispaniola)
 Platynus scriptus (Darlington, 1939)  (Hispaniola)
 Platynus scrobiculatus (Fabricius, 1801)  (Europe)
 Platynus sexualis K. & J.Daniel, 1898  (France and Italy)
 Platynus staveni J.Schmidt, 2009  (Pakistan)
 Platynus stricticollis (Bates, 1878)  (Mexico, Central and South America)
 Platynus strictinotum Liebherr, 1989  (Guatemala)
 Platynus subangustus (Darlington, 1937)  (Cuba)
 Platynus subcordens (Darlington, 1936)  (Hispaniola)
 Platynus subovalis (Darlington, 1936)  (the Lesser Antilles)
 Platynus subovatus (Putzeys, 1875)  (Japan)
 Platynus takabai (Habu, 1962)  (Japan)
 Platynus tasmantus (Morvan, 1996)  (Japan)
 Platynus tenuicollis (LeConte, 1846)  (North America)
 Platynus teriolensis K. & J.Daniel, 1898  (Italy)
 Platynus tipoto (Darlington, 1936)  (Hispaniola)
 Platynus tolucensis (Straneo, 1957)  (Mexico)
 Platynus transcibao (Darlington, 1939)  (Hispaniola)
 Platynus trifoveolatus Beutenmüller, 1903  (North America)
 Platynus trisetosus (Landin, 1955)  (Myanmar)
 Platynus tropicus (Motschulsky, 1865)  (Guatemala and Mexico)
 Platynus turberensis (Perrault, 1991)  (Venezuela)
 Platynus turcicus Apfelbeck, 1904  (Bosnia-Herzegovina)
 Platynus turquinensis (Darlington, 1937)  (Cuba)
 Platynus umbripennis (Casey, 1920)  (Mexico)
 Platynus ustus (Andrewes, 1927)  (India)
 Platynus vagepunctatus (Darlington, 1934)  (the Lesser Antilles)
 Platynus viator (Andrewes, 1931)  (India)
 Platynus visitor (Darlington, 1936)  (Hispaniola)
 Platynus willbergi Reitter, 1891  (Kazakhstan, Kyrgyzstan, and Uzbekistan)
 Platynus wolla (Darlington, 1936)  (Hispaniola)
 Platynus zengae (Morvan & Tian, 2003)  (China)
 † Platynus caesus Scudder, 1890
 † Platynus calvini Wickham, 1917
 † Platynus casus Scudder, 1890
 † Platynus desuetus Scudder, 1890
 † Platynus dilapidatus Scudder, 1895
 † Platynus dissipatus Scudder, 1890
 † Platynus emetikos (Gamboa & Ortuño, 2017)
 † Platynus exterminatus Scudder, 1900
 † Platynus florissantensis Wickham, 1913
 † Platynus halli Scudder, 1890
 † Platynus harttii Scudder, 1890
 † Platynus hindei Scudder, 1890
 † Platynus hoffeinsorum (J.Schmidt, 2015)
 † Platynus insculptipennis Wickham, 1917
 † Platynus interglacialis Scudder, 1900
 † Platynus interitus Scudder, 1900
 † Platynus longaevus Scudder, 1900
 † Platynus pleistocenicus Wickham, 1917
 † Platynus senex Scudder, 1878
 † Platynus subgelidus Wickham, 1917
 † Platynus tartareus Scudder, 1900

References